The 1928 All-Ireland Senior Hurling Championship Final was the 41st All-Ireland Final and the culmination of the 1928 All-Ireland Senior Hurling Championship, an inter-county hurling tournament for the top teams in Ireland. The match was held at Croke Park, Dublin, on 9 September 1928, between Cork and Galway. The Connacht men lost to their Munster opponents on a score line of 6-12 to 1-0.

Match details

1
All-Ireland Senior Hurling Championship Finals
Cork county hurling team matches
Galway GAA matches
All-Ireland Senior Hurling Championship Final
All-Ireland Senior Hurling Championship Final, 1928